Djambala Airport  is an airport serving Djambala, a city in the Plateaux Department of Republic of the Congo.

See also

 List of airports in the Republic of the Congo
 Transport in the Republic of the Congo

References

External links
OurAirports - Djambala
OpenStreetMap - Djambala

Airports in the Republic of the Congo